Nigel Lambert (born 11 May 1944) is an English voice actor. He is best known for his role as the narrator of the first series of the BBC comedy series Look Around You, as well as Merle Ambrose in the MMORPG Wizard101.

Acting since the age of 12, Lambert began his stage education at Arts Educational Trust School, Piccadilly. After a brief spell at the Italia Conti Stage School, he joined a repertory company in Cork before completing his training at RADA. This was following by working in repertory theatre in Ireland and Northampton, as well as the Royal National Theatre. Since then, he has been working in radio and television as well as being a member of Hatch End Players.

He played the role of athlete Ken Sparten in the 1969 SF/horror film Scream and Scream Again, and in more recent years provides the voice of Mr Curry in The Adventures of Paddington Bear television series and also Papa in the Dolmio pasta sauce puppet commercials.

He also appeared as Operative Chris Granger in the UFO episode "Computer Affair" and contributed extensively to the magazine partwork Story Teller published by Marshall Cavendish, consisting of a fortnightly magazine and a cassette tape featuring children's stories.

Lambert has recorded over fifty BBC Audio books.

In 1980, he played the character of Hardin in the Doctor Who story The Leisure Hive, in addition to providing the voice of the Priest Triangle in the 2021 episodes War of the Sontarans and Once, Upon Time.

References

External links

Nigel Lambert at Theatricalia

1944 births
Living people
English male voice actors
Male actors from Essex
People from Southend-on-Sea
Radio and television announcers
Audiobook narrators
Alumni of RADA
Alumni of the Italia Conti Academy of Theatre Arts